Vemsoor(Telugu: వేంసూరు) is a village and mandal in Khammam district of Telangana, India. The majority of the Vemsoor region is agrarian. Most of the people are farmers, peasants and daily laborers. The predominant crops grown in this region are rice, corn, tomatoes, red chilies, vegetables, mangoes, cashew etc. As a mandal headquarters it has several mandal administrative offices. It also has an Andhra bank branch.

Election history
Up to 1948, Hyderabad State was a princely state after merging in Indian union on 17 September 1948 as named as Hyderabad State in the first election in India in 1952. Vemsoor was an assembly constituency from 1951 to 1978. In 1967, Jalagam Vengal Rao won assembly elections second time from Vemsoor and in 1968 he became State Home Minister in the state government headed by Kasu Brahmananda Reddy and also he became chief minister from same constituency.

The following are election Results of the Vemsoor assembly constituency from 1952 to 1972:

1952

ELECTORS : 51987 VOTERS : 36215 POLL PERCENTAGE : 69.66% VALID VOTES 36215

1957

ELECTORS : 57461 VOTERS : 43457 POLL PERCENTAGE : 75.63% VALID VOTES 43457

1962

ELECTORS : 67732 VOTERS : 57794 POLL PERCENTAGE : 85.33% VALID VOTES 56249

1967

ELECTORS : 69466 VOTERS : 55617 POLL PERCENTAGE : 80.06% VALID VOTES : 53206

1972

ELECTORS : 85233 VOTERS : 60378 POLL PERCENTAGE : 70.84% VALID VOTES : 58792

Demographics
 Total population: 42,908 in 10,337 households
 Male population: 21,845
 Female population: 21,063
 Children under 6 years of age: 5,220	(Boys - 2,683 and Girls - 2,537)
 Total literates: 22,079
 Vemsoor has facilities including a government hospital, a police station and a revenue office.

Villages in Khammam district
Mandals in Khammam district